Kyle Gookins (born June 24, 1982) is an American soccer coach who most previously coached the Stetson Hatters men's soccer program. Gookins attended California State University, Bakersfield for both his Bachelor's and Master's, and also played for their soccer team.

Career 

Kyle Gookins began his coaching career immediately after graduating from undergrad, becoming a graduate assistant coach for the CSU Bakerfield Roadrunners. Gookins was part of the Roadrunners program as a graduate assistant coach through 2008. Later that year, he joined the Jeremy Gunn's coaching staff at the University of North Carolina Charlotte. He remained an associate head coach through 2011, and following the team's run to the NCAA national championship, was promoted to top assistant head coach.

On December 21, 2016 Gookins was hired by Stetson University to coach their men's soccer program. In his first season in charge, Gookins was named ASUN Conference Coach of the Year. On November 15, 2017 less than a year in charge, Gookins resigned as the head coach of Stetson citing personal and family reasons.

Head coaching record

Source:

References

External links
 UNC Charlotte Profile
 Stetson Profile

1982 births
Living people
American soccer coaches
Cal State Bakersfield Roadrunners men's soccer coaches
Cal State Bakersfield Roadrunners men's soccer players
Charlotte 49ers men's soccer coaches
Stetson Hatters men's soccer coaches
Association footballers not categorized by position
Association football players not categorized by nationality